Ivindo may refer to:

Ivindo River, Gabon
Ivindo Department, Gabon
Ivindo National Park, Gabon